Gullhaug is a village in the municipality of Holmestrand, Norway. Its population (2012) is 1,900.

References

Villages in Vestfold og Telemark
Populated places in Vestfold og Telemark